The second Battle outside northern Öland was a sea battle fought during the Northern Seven Years' War between Sweden against Denmark and the Free City of Lübeck, on 14 August 1564. Sweden who suffered one ship (Elefanten) won the battle over the allies whom suffered three captured ships (Böse Lejonet, Morian, David).

Sources 

1564 in Denmark
1564
History of Lübeck
Conflicts in 1564
Gotland
Battles involving Denmark
Battles involving Sweden